SellOut is an Australian daytime game show series which airs on 7TWO on 22 September 2014. It's hosted by Michael Pope. The show pits a pair of contestants against each other for the chance to win prizes. These same prizes can then be purchased by the shows viewers.

References

7two original programming
2010s Australian game shows
2014 Australian television series debuts
2014 Australian television series endings